Reiner Margreiter (born 26 June 1975) is an Austrian luger who competed from 1995 to 2006. He won two bronze medals at the 2003 FIL World Luge Championships in Sigulda, Latvia in both the men's singles and the mixed team events.

Competing in two Winter Olympics, his best finish was tenth in the men's singles event at Salt Lake City in 2002

References
2006 Winter Olympics profile
FIL-Luge profile
Hickok sports information on World champions in luge and skeleton.

External links
 

1975 births
Living people
Austrian male lugers
Olympic lugers of Austria
Lugers at the 2002 Winter Olympics
Lugers at the 2006 Winter Olympics